It Takes Two is a 1988 American romantic comedy film directed by David Beaird and starring George Newbern, Leslie Hope, and Kimberly Foster. Screenwriters Richard Christian Matheson and Thomas E. Szollosi had previously teamed up to write the 1987 teen comedy Three O'Clock High.

Premise
Travis Rogers, on the verge of marriage to Stephi, takes off for Dallas, where an encounter with a car saleswoman named Jonni Tigersmith precipitates a series of comic misadventures.

Cast
 George Newbern as Travis Rogers
 Leslie Hope as Stephanie Lawrence
 Kimberly Foster as Jonni Tigersmith
 Barry Corbin as George Lawrence
 Anthony Geary as Wheel
 Frances Lee McCain as Joyce Rogers
 Patrika Darbo as Dee Dee
 Marco Perella as Dave
 Bill Bolender as Judd Rogers
 Mickey Jones as Bucholtz

Reception
Writing in the Los Angeles Times, Michael Wilmington described It Takes Two as "a modestly budgeted comedy with...a frowzy plot" that nevertheless "has relentless pace and snap, real comic vigor." The Time Out Film Guide calls the film "One of the better movies of hit-and-miss director Beaird".

References

External links
 
 
 

1988 films
1988 romantic comedy films
American romantic comedy films
Films directed by David Beaird
Films scored by Carter Burwell
Films set in Dallas
Films with screenplays by Richard Christian Matheson
United Artists films
1980s English-language films
1980s American films